Mika Vermeulen (born 26 June 1999) is an Austrian cross-country skier. He competed in 30 kilometre skiathlon at the 2022 Winter Olympics.

He also competed at the FIS Nordic World Ski Championships 2021 and the 2020–21 FIS Cross-Country World Cup.

His brother Moran is a professional road cyclist. He has also competed in cycling, having competed for UCI Continental team  in 2018.

He has been named after Mika Myllylä, former Finnish cross-country skier.

Cross-country skiing results
All results are sourced from the International Ski Federation (FIS).

Olympic Games

Distance reduced to 30 km due to weather conditions.

World Championships

World Cup

Season standings

References

External links

1999 births
Living people
Austrian male cross-country skiers
Tour de Ski skiers
Cross-country skiers at the 2022 Winter Olympics
Olympic cross-country skiers of Austria
Austrian male cyclists
21st-century Austrian people